Events from the year 1416 in France.

Incumbents
 Monarch – Charles VI

Events
 9–11 March - The Battle of Valmont during the Hundred Years War
 15 August - The Treaty of Canterbury is signed creating an anti-French alliance between England and the Emperor Sigismund

Deaths
 15 June - John, Duke of Berry (born 1340)
 Unknown - Margaret of Bourbon, Lady of Albret (born 1344)

References

1410s in France